Iolaus nolaensis is a butterfly in the family Lycaenidae. It is found in the Republic of the Congo, Tanzania and Zambia.

The larvae feed on the Agelanthus species A. subulatus, A. sansibarensis, A. tanganyikae and A. scassellatii.

Subspecies
Iolaus nolaensis nolaensis (Republic of the Congo: Haute Sangha) 
Iolaus nolaensis amanica (Stempffer, 1951) (Tanzania: north-east to the Usambara Mountains, Zambia)

References

Butterflies described in 1951
Iolaus (butterfly)